St. Aloysius College, Harihar is a private Catholic university located in Harihar, Karnataka, India. It began offering degree courses in 2010 and is an undertaking of the Society of Jesus.

History
St. Aloysius College in Harihar grew out of the Jesuit College in Mangalore that was established in 1880. The Pre University College was first established in Harihar on the church premises of Our Lady of Health in 2005, and moved to the new campus in Amaravathi on the east of Harihar in May 2009, where it began offering the Bachelor of Commerce (BCom) in 2010. In June 2011 the degree college was bifurcated from the PU College, and Vincent Pinto was appointed principal of the new institution.

See also
 List of Jesuit sites

References  

Jesuit universities and colleges in India
Universities and colleges in Davanagere district
Educational institutions established in 2010
2010 establishments in Karnataka